The Beida Mosque  is a mosque located in Qinyang, Henan, China. It is the largest architectural complex of mosque in the Central Plains.

History
According to the Restoration of Mosque, it was first established in the Zhizheng period (1341–1368) of the Yuan dynasty (1271–1368) and rebuilt in 1561, namely the 40th year of Jiajing period (1522–1566) of the Ming dynasty (1368–1644). The mosque turned to ashes by a devastating fire in 1628, and was restored in 1631, during the reign of Chongzhen Emperor. In the Qing dynasty (1644–1911), it was completely destroyed in the earthquake during the ruling of Daoguang Emperor (1821–1850), and was rebuilt on its original site in 1887, in the 13th year of Guangxu period (1875–1908).

In May 2006, it was inscribed to the Major National Historical and Cultural Sites List by the State Council of China.

Architecture
It is divided into a male mosque and a female mosque. It consists of prayer hall, pavilion, wing room and other facilities.

References

1887 establishments in China
Major National Historical and Cultural Sites in Henan
Mosques completed in 1887
Jiaozuo